Edward Oscar Ulrich (1 February 1857, in Covington, Kentucky – 22 February 1944, in Washington, D.C.) was an invertebrate paleontologist specializing in the study of Paleozoic fossils.

Biography
Ulrich was educated at Wallace College and the Ohio Medical College.  Abandoning the practice of medicine, he became curator of the Cincinnati Society of Natural History in 1877, and later was paleontologist to geological surveys of Illinois, Minnesota, and Ohio, also associate editor for ten years of the American Geologist.

Ulrich was a prolific writer, publishing numerous pamphlets on the subject of American paleontology, treating particularly the fossil Bryozoa, Gastropoda, Ostracoda, and Pelecypoda. In 1930 he was awarded the Mary Clark Thompson Medal from the National Academy of Sciences, and he was awarded the Penrose Medal in 1932.

In 1926, with Ray S. Bassler, he described the conodont genus Ancyrodella,

Legacy
An extinct species of graptolite, Climacograptus ulrichi, was named for him in 1908.

Bactritimimus ulrichi, an extinct Carboniferous belemnite, was named in honor of Ulrich in 1959.

In 2002, an extinct genus of monoplacophrans, Ulrichoconus, was named in his honor for his geological studies of the Ozark Plateaus.

Notes

References
 Smithsonian Institution Archives - Record Unit 7332 - Edward Oscar Ulrich Papers William Cox
 
Attribution:

Further reading

External links 
 

American paleontologists
Conodont specialists
Paleozoologists
1857 births
1944 deaths
Penrose Medal winners
19th-century American zoologists
20th-century American zoologists